Lindroos is a Swedish surname primarily used by Swedish-speaking Finns. Notable people with the surname include:

Bengt Lindroos (1918–2010), Swedish architect
Carol Lindroos (1930–2001), Finnish discus thrower
Jari Lindroos (born 1961), retired professional ice hockey player
Lennart Lindroos (1886-1921), Finnish breaststroke swimmer
Petri Lindroos (born 1980), heavy metal guitarist and vocalist
Rikard Lindroos (born 1985), Finnish footballer

Swedish-language surnames